John D. Owens is an American computer engineer, known for his work in GPU computing. He is Child Family Professor of Engineering and Entrepreneurship in the Department of Electrical and Computer Engineering at University of California, Davis.

Education 
John Owens received his Ph.D in electrical engineering in 2003 from Stanford University under the supervision of William J. Dally and Pat Hanrahan.

Awards and honors
Owens was inducted as an IEEE Fellow in 2022 "for contributions to heterogeneous parallel computing".  In 2021 he was also inducted as a AAAS Fellow "for fundamental contributions to commodity parallel computing, particularly in the development of GPU algorithms, data structures, and applications."

In 2007, his paper "Scan Primitives for GPU Computing" won the Best paper award at Graphics Hardware.

Selected publications
.
.
.

References

External links
Google scholar profile

Year of birth missing (living people)
Living people
American electrical engineers
University of California, Davis faculty
Fellows of the American Association for the Advancement of Science